Coyote, New Mexico may refer to the following places in New Mexico:
Coyote, Rio Arriba County, New Mexico, a census-designated place
Coyote, Lincoln County, New Mexico, an unincorporated community